Caloundra Road is a continuous  road route in the Sunshine Coast local government area of Queensland, Australia. Most of it is designated as part of State Route 6. It is a state-controlled district road (number 132), part of which is rated as a local road of regional significance (LRRS).

Route description
It runs east through Meridan Plains until it reaches the exit to Racecourse Road. Racecourse road crosses Caloundra Road by an overbridge and runs to the south, providing access to Corbould Park Racecourse. This intersection provides access to Kawana Way Link Road to the north and Bells Creek Arterial Road to the south.

The road continues east and reaches the exit to Parklands Boulevard to the north-east and Pierce Avenue to the south-west. It then runs through Little Mountain, climbing the range until it reaches the exit to Sugar Bag Road to the north-east. This intersection provides access to Nicklin Way to the north-east and Pelican Waters Boulevard to the south.

Continuing south-east it reaches an intersection with West Terrace and Baldwin Street, where the road name changes to Bowman Road. It then turns east and passes the exit to Park Terrace, which leads to Landsborough Parade and then to the Esplanade, to the south. The road continues east until it reaches an intersection where Bowman Road turns north-east, where it ends. The physical road continues east as Bulcock Street.

Land use along the road is mainly rural in the west and industrial/retail in the east.

Road condition
The road is fully sealed, and all of it is four-lane divided road.

Upgrade projects
A project to upgrade the intersection of Caloundra Road and Ridgewood Road, at a cost of $3.75 million, was completed in November 2021.

A project to plan the upgrade of the intersection of Caloundra Road, Kawana Way Link Road and Bells Creek Arterial Road, at a cost of $2 million, was expected to complete a business case in 2023.

Related Bruce Highway project
The intersection with the Bruce Highway at Meridan Plains was upgraded in 2021 as part of a project to expand the highway to six lanes at that point and to improve traffic flow through the intersection.

History

Meridan Plains pastoral run was established circa 1870. In 2019 Corbould Park was excised from Meridan Plains to become a separate locality.

The first sale of alottments in Caloundra took place in 1883. The first school opened in 1899, and further land sales were conducted in 1907, 1917 and 1919.

The first lighthouse in Caloundra was constructed in 1896.

Major intersections
All distances are from Google Maps. The entire road is within the Sunshine Coast local government area.

See also

 List of road routes in Queensland
 List of numbered roads in Queensland

Notes

References

Roads in Queensland